The Electric Light Orchestra is the debut studio album by English rock band Electric Light Orchestra (ELO), released in December 1971 in the United Kingdom by Harvest Records. In the United States, the album was released in March 1972 as No Answer, after a misunderstood telephone message made by a United Artists Records executive asking about the album name; the caller, having failed to reach the ELO contact, wrote down "no answer" in his notes, and this was misconstrued to be the name of the album.

Recording
The album is focused on the core trio of Roy Wood, Jeff Lynne and Bev Bevan, who were the remaining members of rock group the Move. The Move were still releasing singles in the UK at the same time as this project was undertaken, but interest was soon to be abandoned in Wood's former band. In fact, the Move's final album, Message from the Country, was recorded simultaneously with The Electric Light Orchestra.

The sound on The Electric Light Orchestra is unique on this recording in comparison to the more slickly produced ELO albums of the subsequent Lynne years, incorporating many wind instruments and replacing guitar parts with heavy, "sawing" cello riffs, giving this recording an experimental "baroque-and-roll" feel; indeed, "The Battle of Marston Moor" is the most baroque-influenced track on the album. On this track, Roy Wood, in addition to playing virtually all the instruments, had to provide the percussion as well because Bev Bevan, normally the group's percussionist and drummer, refused to play on the track because of his low opinion of it.

Release

"Queen of the Hours", which later became the B-side to "Roll Over Beethoven" from the band's second album ELO 2, was the first ever published ELO song, released by Harvest Records in November 1971 in a compilation called The Harvest Bag which featured various Harvest records artists.

The original LP was mixed in Quadraphonic sound but was only released in this format in South America. Many of these "quad" tracks appeared with the SQ encoding intact on the "First Light" series edition of the album and on a later double-CD release entitled Early ELO, 1971–1974 (available only as an import in the US). The entire "quad" version with SQ encoding intact has since been released on disc 3 of the Harvest Years compilation.

The original album art was designed by Hipgnosis; the photographs of the band on the back of the album cover, dressed in 17th-century period costume, were taken at the Banqueting House in Whitehall, adding to the Baroque flavour and emphasis on Stuart Britain found on the record.

"Mr. Radio" was intended to be the second single from the album, but was subsequently withdrawn. The edited single version made its first appearance on the 2005 compilation album Harvest Showdown instead.

Track listing

The Electric Light Orchestra (First Light Series)

The Electric Light Orchestra (First Light Series) is a two-disc expanded special 30th anniversary edition of their debut album.

Released in 2001 in the UK, disc one contains the original ELO album plus bonus tracks and an interactive CD-ROM feature, while disc two features the oldest surviving live ELO material with co/founder Roy Wood and cellist Andy Craig.

Disc one

Enhanced multimedia section with interactive menu leading to EMI Promotional Film: 10538 Overture (May 1972)

Disc two

Personnel
Jeff Lynne – vocals, piano, electric guitar, acoustic guitar, percussion, bass, Moog synthesizer
Roy Wood – vocals, cello, classical acoustic guitar, bass, double bass, oboe, bassoon, clarinet, recorder, slide guitar, percussion, bass clarinet, krumhorn, drums on "The Battle of Marston Moor"
Bev Bevan – drums, timpani, percussion
Bill Hunt – French horn, hunting horn, piccolo trumpet
Steve Woolam – violin

Charts

References

External links
 No Answer Remastered info at ftmusic

Electric Light Orchestra albums
Albums produced by Jeff Lynne
Albums produced by Roy Wood
Albums with cover art by Hipgnosis
1971 debut albums
Harvest Records albums
United Artists Records albums
Jet Records albums